Symphyotrichum depauperatum (formerly Aster depauperatus), commonly known as serpentine aster or starved aster, is a rare species in the family Asteraceae adapted to serpentine barrens, an ecosystem with a high concentration of toxic metals in the soil. It has been found in Pennsylvania, Maryland, and on some diabase glades in North Carolina.

Description
The plant produces numerous flower heads in branched arrays, each head with 7–14 white or, rarely, pink ray florets surrounding 7–17 yellow disk florets.

Taxonomy
Within the genus Symphyotrichum, S. depauperatum has been classified in subgenus Symphyotrichum   Its full name with author citation is Symphyotrichum depauperatum . It was first described by American botanist Merritt Lyndon Fernald in 1908 as Aster depauperatus.

Distribution and habitat

S. depauperatum is adapted to serpentine barrens, an ecosystem with a high concentration of toxic metals in the soil. It has been found in Baltimore and Cecil Counties, Maryland; Granville County, North Carolina; and, Chester, Delaware, and Lancaster Counties, Pennsylvania.

Serpentine aster has been called a "flagship species" of the unique serpentine ecosystem and was once thought to be endemic to these barrens, but it also has been found to occur in a disjoint population on diabase glades in Granville County, North Carolina.

Conservation
Symphyotrichum depauperatum is classified by the state of Pennsylvania as a threatened species because its range is restricted to a few limited areas, and the majority of its populations occur on sites threatened by quarrying, housing development, and industrial development.

, NatureServe listed it as Globally Imperiled (G2); Critically Imperiled (S1) in Maryland and North Carolina; and, Imperiled (S2) in Pennsylvania. NatureServe's most recent review of S. depauperatums global status was 3 October 1997.

Citations

References

External links

Information about Symphyotrichum depauperatum also can be seen at the following pages:
 Ladybird Johnson Wildflower Center (wildflower.org)
 University of Waterloo Astereae Lab
 Vascular Plants of North Carolina
 Pennsylvania Natural Heritage Program
 Maryland Biodiversity Project
 Symphyotrichum depauperatum as Pennsylvania Threatened in the Pennsylvania Code

depauperatum
Threatened flora of the United States
Endemic flora of the United States
Flora of the Eastern United States
Plants described in 1884
Taxa named by Merritt Lyndon Fernald